Pierre Moerlen's Gong was an instrumental jazz fusion band led by French drummer Pierre Moerlen which developed as an offshoot of the psychedelic progressive rock band Gong founded and led by Daevid Allen. It was notable for the prominent use of mallet percussion, particularly vibraphone, in a jazz-rock context.

History
Amid a flurry of line-up changes in the mid-1970s, including the departure of founding members Daevid Allen and Gilli Smyth, Gong drummer Pierre Moerlen was in charge of the band with two albums remaining on a contract with Virgin.

Moerlen formed a new line-up with his brother Benoit on mallet percussion, US-born bassist Hansford Rowe, and a rotating cast of session guitarists, notably Allan Holdsworth, Mick Taylor, Mike Oldfield, and Bon Lozaga.

They released two albums under the Gong moniker, Gazeuse! (called Expresso in North America) in 1976 and then Expresso II in 1978. Following the completion of the Virgin contract, Moerlen changed the name of the group to Pierre Moerlen's Gong. In early 1979, the group released Downwind, which was a more rock/pop flavoured album that featured occasional lead vocals by Moerlen himself and a cameo by Steve Winwood. Later in 1979 they released another album, Time is the Key, that took the band further into pop/rock territory. The live album "Pierre Moerlen's Gong Live" was released in 1980, followed by another studio album, Leave It Open, in 1981. By this point, Pierre Moerlen's incarnation of Gong scaled back its activity greatly, not releasing another record until 1986's Scientology-inspired Breakthrough, featuring members of the Swedish band Tribute. Second Wind followed in 1988. The group quietly disbanded soon after.

Lozaga, Rowe, and Benoit Moerlen went on to form Gongzilla in the early 1990s, releasing four albums to date which are very much an extension of the percussive fusion that the original group brought to the fold, and they perform a mix of new and old live material going back to the Gazeuse/Expresso II period. Moerlen joined them for their 2002 European tour.

Moerlen revived the Pierre Moerlen's Gong name in 2002 and recorded the album Pentanine with Russian musicians.

The last Pierre Moerlen's Gong album was started in 2005 with another new line-up, this time of young French musicians, when Moerlen died unexpectedly on 3 May 2005, age 53, of natural causes.  Although the project was at an early stage, the band nevertheless decided to record Pierre's last compositions, along with some of their own, and release it posthumously as Tribute in 2010.

Personnel

Discography
 1976: Gazeuse! (Expresso in North America) (issued as a "Gong" album)
 1978: Expresso II (issued as a "Gong" album)
 1979: Downwind
 1979: Time Is the Key
 1980: Pierre Moerlen's Gong Live
 1981: Leave It Open
 1986: Breakthrough
 1988: Second Wind
 1998: Full Circle Live '88
 2004: Pentanine
 2010: Tribute (post-Pierre Moerlen)

Filmography
 2015: Romantic Warriors III: Canterbury Tales (DVD)

References
Macan, E. L., Macan, E. (1997). Rocking the Classics: English Progressive Rock and the Counterculture. Germany: Oxford University Press. p. 243

External links
Planet Gong
[ Pierre Moerlen's Gong on Allmusic Guide]

Jazz-rock groups
Jazz fusion ensembles
Canterbury scene
British progressive rock groups